Heythuysen is a town in the south-eastern Netherlands.

History 
It was first mentioned in 1383 as Heythusen, and means "houses on the heath". It was located on the road from Venlo to Antwerp, and between the Bevelandse beek and the Tungelroyse beek. In 1243, it became a border town for the County of Horne. In 1680, Heythuysen became an independent heerlijkheid.

The Catholic St Nicolaas Church is a three-aisled church which was built shortly after 1504. In 1847, the current Gothic Revival tower was built. In 1927, the church was enlarged.

Heythuysen was home to 275 people in 1840. Until it became a part of Leudal on 1 January 2007, Heythuysen was a separate municipality, including the villages of Baexem, Grathem and Kelpen-Oler. Heythuysen is home of the Grand Café Tom Tom.

Gallery

References

Municipalities of the Netherlands disestablished in 2007
Populated places in Limburg (Netherlands)
Former municipalities of Limburg (Netherlands)
Leudal